Dennis Smook is a Canadian politician and member of the Legislative Assembly of Manitoba, representing the electoral district of La Verendrye as a member of the Progressive Conservative Party of Manitoba. He was first elected in the 2011 provincial election, and re-elected in 2016 and 2019.

Electoral record

References

External links
Dennis Smook

Living people
Progressive Conservative Party of Manitoba MLAs
People from Eastman Region, Manitoba
Year of birth missing (living people)
21st-century Canadian politicians